The R100 was a British rigid airship in operation from 1929–1930.

R100 may also refer to:
Any of several BMW motorcycles from the 1970s and 1980s, including the R100R, R100RT, R100LT, and R100 GS
Imme R100, a German motorcycle made from 1948–1950
Mazda R100, a coupe car
Radeon R100, a graphics chip
NEC R100, prototype for the PaPeRo, a personal robot
R100 (film), a 2013 film by Hitoshi Matsumoto
Norristown High Speed Line, previously named R100
 a respirator class